Operation Beit ol-Moqaddas 4 (Persian: عملیات بیت المقدس ۴) was a military operation during Iran-Iraq War which was launched by Iran on 25 March 1988 by the code of "Ya Aba Abd-Allah al-Hussain (a.s.)" (Persian: «یااباعبدالله الحسین (ع)») at the axis of Halabcheh-Shakhshemiran, by the command of Islamic Revolutionary Guard Corps, and it was lasted for two days. The goal of the operation was to fulfill/secure the left flank of Operation Dawn 10 area—which was considered as a sensitive area for Iraq.

Locality 

The operation area of Beitol Moqaddas-4 was a mountainous region, including:
 Darbandikhan lake and Shakh-Tamurzhenan (from the north)
 Martke plain; Shakh-Khashik heights and Bamoo (from the south)
 Zimkan river and Bizel mountain (from the east)
 Dam of Darbandikhan and Qashti heights (from the west)

Results 
Operation Beit al-Moqaddas-4 resulted in the conquering of several areas of Iraq by Iranian forces, including:

 Complete possession of ShakhShemiran heights and Shakh-Sumer
 Possession of a part of "Dasht-Tolbi" and "Bardaddkan heights"
 The killing/injuring approximately 5000 Iraqi soldiers
 The capture of 498 Iraqi soldiers
 Destruction of at least 15 tanks and 50 cars
 Additional Iranian "war spoils".

See also 
 Operation Beit ol-Moqaddas 3
 Operation Dawn 10

References 

Iran–Iraq War
1988 in Iran
1988 in Iraq
Military operations of the Iran–Iraq War
Military operations of the Iran–Iraq War in 1988